The Socialist Party of Bangladesh (Marxist)() also known as BASAD-Marxist or BSD-Marxist, is an anti-revisionist Marxist-Leninist communist party in Bangladesh. The party works closely with a coalition of leftists in Bangladesh the Left Democratic Alliance.

Due to the non-recognition of Shibdas Ghosh, the theorist of revolutionary politics in India, as the international authority of the communist movement, two central leaders left the Socialist Party of Bangladesh (BSD) in 2013 and formed a new party, the BSD (Marxist). In February 2020, another split of the party took place as a result of expulsion of member of working committee Subhangshu Chakrabarty and 16 forum members. This split resulted in the formation of Communist Movement of Bangladesh (CMB)

The party's monthly mouthpiece is called Sammobad.

History 
The party made its debut at a press conference on April 7, 2013. It was formed by members of BSD under the leadership of Mubinul Haider Chowdhury who did not agree with party's policy towards Ganajagaran Mancha and Shivdas Ghosh. This fraction wanted Shivdas Ghosh to be declared the international authority of the communist movement. Mubinul Haider Chowdhury was elected General Secretary of the 9-member Central Working Committee at a Special Central Convention held on 20-23 November 2014.

Due to the lack of proper application of ideology in the organization, a breakdown took place in February 2020. The rift was accelerated by the expulsion of 18 leaders and activists, including Shuvrangshu Chakraborty. This rebel fraction tried to form a new party called the Socialist Party of Bangladesh (Marxist) - Central Pathchakra Forum. Later on 3 April 2021 this fraction under the leadership of Subhangshu Chakrabarty launched the Communist Movement of Bangladesh (CMB). In a press conference the rebel leader Subhangshu Chakrabarty claimed that CMB is the only party in Bangladesh with a true revolutionary Marxist idea.

See also 
 Shibdas Ghosh
 Socialist Unity Centre of India (Communist)
 List of political parties in Bangladesh

References 

2013 establishments in Bangladesh
Political parties established in 2013
Communist parties in Bangladesh
Stalinist parties
Anti-revisionist organizations
Political parties in Bangladesh